Yorick is a character in William Shakespeare's play Hamlet. He is the dead court jester whose skull is exhumed by the First Gravedigger in Act 5, Scene 1, of the play. The sight of Yorick's skull evokes a reminiscence by Prince Hamlet of the man, who apparently played a role during Hamlet's upbringing:
Alas, poor Yorick! I knew him, Horatio; a fellow of infinite jest, of most excellent fancy; he hath borne me on his back a thousand times; and now, how abhorred in my imagination it is! My gorge rises at it. Here hung those lips that I have kissed I know not how oft. Where be your gibes now? Your gambols? Your songs? Your flashes of merriment, that were wont to set the table on a roar? (Hamlet, V.i)

It is suggested that Shakespeare may have intended his audience to connect Yorick with the Elizabethan comedian Richard Tarlton, a celebrated performer of the pre-Shakespearean stage, who had died a decade or so before Hamlet was first performed.

Vanitas imagery

The contrast between Yorick as "a fellow of infinite jest, of most excellent fancy" and his grim remains reflects on the theme of earthly vanity: death being unavoidable, the things of this life are inconsequential.

This theme of Memento mori ("Remember you shall die") is common in 16th- and 17th-century painting, appearing in art throughout Europe. Images of Mary Magdalene regularly showed her contemplating a skull. It is also a very common motif in 15th- and 16th-century British portraiture.

Memento mori are also expressed in images of playful children or young men, depicted looking at a skull as a sign of the transience of life. It was also a familiar motif in emblem books and tombs.

Hamlet meditating upon the skull of Yorick has become a lasting embodiment of this idea, and has been depicted by later artists as part of the vanitas tradition.

Name
The name Yorick has been interpreted as an attempt to render a Scandinavian forename: usually either "Eric" or "Jørg", a form of the name George. The name "Rorik" has also been suggested, since it appears in Saxo Grammaticus, one of Shakespeare's source texts, as the name of the queen's father. There has been no agreement about which name is most likely.

Alternative suggestions include the ideas that it may be derived from the Viking name of the city of York (Jórvík), or that it is a near-anagram of the Greek word 'Kyrios' and thus a reference to the Catholic martyr Edmund Campion.

The name was used by Laurence Sterne in his comic novels Tristram Shandy and A Sentimental Journey as the surname of one of the characters, a parson who is a humorous portrait of the author. Parson Yorick is supposed to be descended from Shakespeare's Yorick.

Portrayals

The earliest known printed image of Hamlet holding Yorick's skull is a 1773 engraving by John Hall after a design by Edward Edwards in Bell's edition of Shakespeare's plays. It has since become a common subject. While Yorick normally only appears as the skull, there have been scattered portrayals of him as a living man, such as Philip Hermogenes Calderon's painting The Young Lord Hamlet (1868), which depicts him carrying the child Hamlet on his back, as if being ridden like a horse by the prince. He was portrayed by comedian Ken Dodd in a flashback during the gravedigging scene in Kenneth Branagh's 1996 film Hamlet.

Pianist André Tchaikowsky donated his skull to the Royal Shakespeare Company for use in theatrical productions, hoping that it would be used as the skull of Yorick. Tchaikowsky died in 1982. His skull was used during rehearsals for a 1989 RSC production of Hamlet starring Mark Rylance, but the company eventually decided to use a replica skull in the performance. Musical director Claire van Kampen, who later married Rylance, recalled:

Although Tchaikowsky's skull was not used in the performances of this production, its use during rehearsals affected some interpretations and line readings: for example, Rylance delivered the line "That skull had a tongue in it, and could sing once" with especial reproach. In this production, Hamlet retained Yorick's skull throughout subsequent scenes, and it was eventually placed on a mantelpiece as a "talisman" during his final duel with Laertes. In 2008, Tchaikowsky's skull was used by David Tennant in an RSC production of Hamlet at the Courtyard Theatre, Stratford-upon-Avon. It was later announced that the skull had been replaced after it became apparent that news of the skull distracted the audience too much from the play. This was untrue however, and the skull was used as a prop throughout the run of the production after its move to London's West End.

Yorick appears as a principal character in the novel The Skull of Truth by Bruce Coville.

References

Characters in Hamlet
Fictional clowns
Fictional Danish people
Male Shakespearean characters